The American University of Central Asia (AUCA), formerly the Kyrgyz-American School and the American University in Kyrgyzstan, is a liberal arts university located in Bishkek, the capital of the republic of Kyrgyzstan.

History
AUCA began its existence in 1993 as the Kyrgyz-American School (KAS), a specialist school within the Kyrgyz State National University (KSNU) in Bishkek. In 1997, it was established as an independent institution and given a new name, the American University in Kyrgyzstan (AUK). Funding was provided by the United States government and the Open Society Institute (an NGO established by Hungarian philanthropist George Soros). One of its founders was human rights attorney and journalist Scott Horton. 

In 2002, AUCA adopted its current name, to reflect both that its student body was drawn from many countries, and the university's goal was to serve the entire region. While the university focuses on offering higher education opportunities to Central Asian students, its student body and faculty increasingly come from all over Asia and other parts of the world.

In March 2010, AUCA established a partnership with Bard College located in New York State in the United States. The partnership allows students of American Studies, Anthropology, Economics, European Studies, International and Comparative Politics, Journalism and Mass Communications, Psychology, Sociology, and Software Engineering programs to receive liberal arts degrees fully accredited in the US.

According to the USAID accreditation report, "AUCA is the first higher education institution in Central Asia that functions according to the American model, with a credit-hour system, an American-style liberal arts curriculum, and a commitment to democratic values, freedom of expression and inquiry, and academic integrity and honesty."

The university is chartered in Kyrgyzstan and is authorized by the Kyrgyz Ministry of Education to offer the Kyrgyz National Diploma in eleven undergraduate programs and one graduate program, an MBA. AUCA also offers American-style diplomas, and students are required to take courses in both Russian and English.

Old Campus

The former main building of American University of Central Asia was constructed in the 1930s and was used by the Central Committee of the Communist Party of the Kirghiz SSR, and by the Supreme Soviet of the Kirghiz Soviet Socialist Republic.

Portraits of Vladimir Lenin, Karl Marx, and Friedrich Engels still hang in the conference hall of the old main building of AUCA, while the coat of arms of the Kirghiz SSR is kept on the facade of the building.

In 2008 Ishak Masaliev, then a Kyrgyz parliament member from the Party of Communists of Kyrgyzstan, called to change the location of AUCA, because of the "historic value" of the current main building.

New Campus 
The new building has four stories, centered around a forum that serves as the main meeting place. The main building uses geothermal heating and rainwater harvesting to reduce its environmental impact. The building was designed by New York based architect Henry Myerberg and opened in 2015.

Academic programs

Preparatory programs 
The university offers full-time and part-time programs to prepare students for university study.  The programs include an intensive course of English language learning and university-level academic classes.

Undergraduate programs 
The university offers American-style Bachelor of Arts degrees in 15 undergraduate programs:

 Anthropology, technology and international development
 Applied geology
 Applied mathematics and informatics
 Business administration
 Economics
 Environmental sustainability and climate science
 European studies
 International and comparative politics
 International and business law
 Liberal Arts and Sciences or Liberal arts education
 Journalism and mass communication
 Psychology
 Sociology
 Software engineering
 Television, cinema and media arts

The university's General Education Program offers units from a core curriculum, that may be taken towards credits in any undergraduate program.

Graduate programs 
In addition to its undergraduate programs, AUCA offers professional programs in ten of Kyrgyzstan's "most needed specialties." These are:
 Master of Arts 
 Anthropology, Urbanism and International Development
 Applied psychology
 Central Asian studies
 Journalism
 Sociology
 Master of Arts in Teaching
 Master of Business Administration (MBA)
 Master of Laws (LL.M.)
 Master of Science in Economics Program (MSc)
 Master in Talent Management and Human Potential Development

Library
AUCA Library provides information resources and services in support of teaching, learning and research. The library holds about 60,000 items in its print collection of books, textbooks, manuscripts and other materials. The library provides access to 24 online databases.   The Library of AUCA partnered with Kyrgyz Libraries Information Consortium in 2006 to initiate Open Access in Kyrgyzstan. The American University of Central Asia acted as the pilot university for the Electronic Archive program.  Today, the library offers open access to 21 different resources, all listed on the website.

Rankings 
American University of Central Asia was ranked 138th among 449 universities from countries of the emerging Europe and Central Asia region in Quacquarelli Symonds EECA University Rankings of 2022.

Governance

Presidents 
 John Clark - 1997-2000
 David Huwiler - 2000-2004
 John D. Dreier - 2004-2005
 Ellen Hurwitz - 2005-2010
 Andrew Wachtel - 2010-2018
 Jonathan Becker - 2018-2019
 Andrew Kuchins - 2019-2021
 Jonathan Becker - 2021-present

Provosts 
 Kamilla Sharshekeeva 1997-2003
 Gulnara Aitbaeva 2003-2006
 Bakyt Beshimov 2006-2008

Gallery

References

External links 

 AUCA official website
 The NGA: Important details for AUCA students
 AUCA student life
 AUCA Library policies and rules
 Administrative departments at AUCA
 Official Alumni website
 

Educational institutions established in 1993
1993 establishments in Kyrgyzstan
American University of Central Asia
George Soros